Hugo Chávez, the President of Venezuela from 1999 until 2013, has elicited a variety of public perceptions regarding his policies, personality, and performance as a head of state.

Domestic media

Private media

In 2006, President Chávez announced that the shut down of Radio Caracas Televisión (RCTV), Venezuela's second largest TV channel. The channel's twas shut down on 28 May 2007 and was replaced with a state network, TVes. This action was condemned by a multitude of international organizations. In a poll conducted by Datanálisis, almost 70 percent of Venezuelans polled opposed the shut-down.  

In 2007, the Venezuelan government filed a complaint against Globovisión with the Attorney General Office. Chávez demanded sanctions against Globovisión, calling station director Alberto Federico Ravell "We're not going to tolerate a crazy man with a cannon shooting it at the whole world". This action was criticized by two officials who monitor freedom of speech, Frank La Rue of the United Nations and Catalina Botero of the Organization of American States (OAS). By 2008, Reporters Without Borders reported that following "years of 'media war,' Hugo Chávez and his government took control of almost the entire broadcast sector".

The private media in Venezuela was eventually pressured by the Venezuelan government into self-censorship. Reporters Without Borders said that the media in Venezuela is "almost entirely dominated by the government and its obligatory announcements, called cadenas while Freedom House stated that "many previously opposition-aligned outlets have altered their editorial stances to avoid drawing the government’s ire" with censorship increasing significantly during the final years of Chávez's presidency. Since Chávez's death, private media organizations such as El Universal, Globovisión and Últimas Noticias were bought by individuals linked to the Venezuelan government.

State media

Aló Presidente 

In 2001, Chávez turned Aló Presidente from a radio show to a full-fledged live, unscripted, television show on public-owned media that ran during all hours of the day promoting the Bolivarian Revolution. The show aired every Sunday, depicting Chávez (wearing red, the color of the revolution) as the charismatic leader, passionate about the well being of his country. Many Venezuelans tuned in because Chávez was known for unveiling new financial assistance packages every weekend. Chávez spent an average of 40 hours a week on television. The show was considered the principal link between the Venezuelan government and its citizens, and was a source of information for both official and opposition media and at international level. The show featured Chávez addressing topics of the day, taking phone calls from the audience, and touring locations where government social welfare programs were active.

Bolivarian propaganda

Hugo Chávez used propaganda that took advantage of emotional arguments to gain attention, exploit the fears (either real or imagined) of the population, created external enemies for scapegoat purposes, and produced nationalism within the population, causing feelings of betrayal for support of the opposition. In 2007, The World Politics Review stated that "As Chávez pushes on with transforming Venezuela into a socialist state, government propaganda plays an important role in maintaining and mobilizing government supporters". A 2011 New York Times article said that Venezuela had an "expanding state propaganda complex" while The Boston Globe described Chávez as "a media savvy, forward-thinking propagandist [who] has the oil wealth to influence public opinion".

Chávez used television both domestically through cadenas and international through outlets like TeleSUR for propaganda purposes  while websites like Aporrea.org, Radio Nacional de Venezuela, Venezuelanalysis.com, were used by the Venezuelan government for propaganda purposes. Chávez was also promoted through educational systems introduced by his government in Venezuela, which focused on achievements made under his policies. A cult of personality was then created around Chávez in Venezuela among his supporters.

International media

Europe
According to PBS, Hugo Chávez was popular among anti-globalization individuals of the press in Europe, including former director of Le Monde diplomatique, Ignacio Ramonet.

North America

Canada
On 13 March 2007 the Ontario Press Council upheld a complaint that a series of articles published in the Toronto Star in May 2006 lacked balance due to the absence of comment from Venezuelan government representatives and did not attribute figures about murder rate, poverty and unemployment to opposition sources.

Bibliography

Notes

External links
The media's misunderstanding of Venezuela

Hugo Chávez
Media bias controversies
Hugo Chávez
Chavez, Hugo